The  of Toyama Chihō Railway, commonly referred to as , is a narrow gauge tram system in Toyama, Japan. Its first operation was in 1912. It has 23 stations and runs 7.3 km. 

While the system officially consists of five lines, the operation has been re-organized into three routes:
Route 1: Minami-Toyama Ekimae (Minami-Toyama Station) — Toyama Ekimae (Toyama Station)
Route 2: Minami-Toyama Ekimae — Daigakumae (University of Toyama)
Route 3: Loop

Since 2010, the tram accepts the Ecomyca and passca smart cards for fare payment.

Since March 21, 2020, with the completion of a north south tram link across Toyama Railway Station, Toyama City Tram services through operate with the Toyama Chihō Railway Toyamakō Line.

References

Rail transport in Toyama Prefecture
Toyama (city)
1067 mm gauge railways in Japan
Railway lines opened in 1912